The Bagre Norte Fault is a sinistral oblique strike-slip fault in the departments of Antioquia and Bolívar in northern Colombia.

Etymology 
The fault is named after El Bagre.

Description 
The Bagre Norte Fault branches from the Palestina Fault, close to the Alicante River. The fault juxtaposes Precambrian metamorphic rocks on the east against sedimentary rocks in the west. The fault shows as a prominent topographic lineament on satellite images and aerial photographs. The strong geomorphologic expression suggests Quaternary activity.

See also 

 List of earthquakes in Colombia
 Bucaramanga-Santa Marta Fault
 Romeral Fault System
 Otú Norte Fault

References

Bibliography

Maps

Further reading 
 

Seismic faults of Colombia
Strike-slip faults
Thrust faults
Inactive faults
Faults
Faults